Qasemi (also Romanized as Qāsemī) is a village in Eshqabad Rural District, Miyan Jolgeh District, Nishapur County, Razavi Khorasan Province, Iran. At the 2006 census, its population was 466, in 115 families.

References 

Populated places in Nishapur County